Love vs. Money is the second album by American R&B singer, songwriter, and producer The-Dream. It was released on March 10, 2009, by Radio Killa and Def Jam Recordings.

The album was written and produced primarily by The-Dream with his creative partner Christopher "Tricky" Stewart. Recording sessions for the album took place at several recording studios, including Chung King Studios in New York City and Studio at the Palms in Las Vegas. With the album, The-Dream sought to amplify the sonic dynamics of his debut album Love/Hate, incorporating elements of pop and electro. Love vs. Money features themes of seduction, rejection, and money in relation to romantic love.

The album debuted at number two on the US Billboard 200, selling 151,000 copies in its first week. It spent 17 weeks on the chart, and by May 2009, it had sold 331,000 copies in the United States. Four singles were released and performed well on Billboard charts, including "Rockin' That Shit", "Walkin' on the Moon" and "Sweat It Out". Love vs. Money was a widespread critical success and listed by several publications as among the best albums of 2009.

Recording
The album is the follow-up to The-Dream's gold-certified debut album, Love/Hate (2007). He re-teamed with his production partner Christopher Stewart, who produced most of the tracks on the album, and Los Da Mystro He also enlisted the help of Lil Jon for the song "Let Me See the Booty". He initially stated that he had collaborated with Ludacris and Fabolous, however they failed to appear on the final track listing. At an album listening event, a song booklet was given showing the album's initial track listing, including the unreleased "Touch & Feel" and "Nothing but Love". Rappers Kanye West and singer Mariah Carey both appear on the album as guest features.

Recording sessions for the album took place at Chung King Studios and Legacy Recording Studios in New York City, with additional recording done in Las Vegas, Nevada, Malibu, California, and Triangle Sound Studios in Atlanta, Georgia. The album's packaging features photography by Joseph Cultice.

Music and lyrics

Primarily an R&B album, Love vs. Money incorporates elements of electro and pop music, while its lyrics concern themes of love, sex, and money. The production incorporates elements such as broad synthesizer lines, punchy drumbeats, and computerized vocals. Its musical structure features the "stream-of-consciousness" song transition of The-Dream's debut album Love/Hate. Alex Macpherson of The Quietus characterizes the album as "a palindromic song cycle of seduction, rejection, recrimination and ultimately – maybe – validation", writing that "as on Love/Hate, the tension between the character The-Dream likes to project – the cocky, preening, slightly lecherous lothario – and the reality of who he is – a slightly bug-eyed chump – proves fruitful." Macpherson views the album's centrepiece, its two title tracks, as a "stürm und drang" turning point for The-Dream's character, in which he mulls over a disastrous relationship. Jordan Sargent, critic for PopMatters, mused on The-Dream's approach to composition:

The Washington Posts Allison Stewart writes that the album "cribs heavily from vintage R. Kelly in the same way its predecessor,... Love Hate, borrowed from Purple Rain-era Prince". The track "Kelly's 12 Play" references R. Kelly's 1993 album 12 Play. In an interview for DJBooth, The-Dream discussed his musical approach to the album, stating "This album's gonna be the same thing – a little more beefed up, I'm just gonna give you more. Every album I'm just gonna try to give you more of me, and what I think about certain things... This album is just gonna be the first album on some out of this world crack, basically". In an interview for The Village Voice, he discussed his use of melody, repetition, and hooks, relating it to child discipline, saying that "Americans are not the biggest listeners. I didn't listen, which is why my granddaddy beat me half the time. It's only when the belt is swinging at you in the same repetitive manner that you actually start to listen. So it's all about creating a belt on the song that repetitiously swings at you. It doesn't mean that in between the belt swinging, I'm not saying stuff that means something".

Marketing and sales 
"Rockin' That Shit" was released on December 8, 2008, as the lead single in support of the album. It reached number 22 on the Billboard Hot 100. The second single "My Love" reached number 82, the third single "Walkin' on the Moon" reached number 87, and the final single "Sweat It Out" reached number 32 on the Hot R&B/Hip-Hop Songs.

Originally set for release by the end of 2008, Love vs. Money was released on March 10, 2009, through The-Dream's imprint label Radio Killa and Def Jam Recordings. It debuted at number two on the Billboard 200, selling 151,000 copies in its first week. By May 2009, it had sold 331,000 copies, according to Nielsen SoundScan. On May 13, The-Dream embarked on a 21-city tour with R&B singer Keyshia Cole, first playing the Aronoff Center in Cincinnati and concluding the tour at Paramount Theater in Oakland on June 21.

Critical reception

Love vs. Money was met with widespread critical acclaim. At Metacritic, which assigns a normalized rating out of 100 to reviews from professional publications, the album received an average score of 83, based on 13 reviews.

Reviewing in March 2009 for Rolling Stone, Jody Rosen found most of the album's songs "unforgettable" and said, "the combination of classicist songcraft, wild sound collage and a muse that partakes equally of the sensual and the silly makes Love vs. Money far more than just an accomplished genre piece". Alex Macpherson of The Quietus noted its cyclical thematic structure, but stated, "it's how the wheel turns, endlessly and inevitably, which is what compels about Love vs Money." Slant Magazines Wilson McBee viewed it as an improvement over Love Hate and wrote that it "keeps to the same aesthetic touchstones [...] while cranking up the gears of ambition". He also called the album "a cohesive, front-to-back artistic statement", and said of its studio and hook-oriented "songcraft": "What keeps all this over-production from being distracting is Nash's intelligent arrangements and a keen avoidance of clutter." AllMusic editor Andy Kellman hailed it as "Love/Hates equal, stuffed with hooks, ceaselessly absorptive productions, and clever and often funny wordplay". Sean Fennessey of Vibe praised The-Dream's production and stated, "The craft is meticulous, and the sound so epic, and at times, operatic [...] that moments on this album comprise some of the best pop music of the decade". Ajitpaul Mangat of Tiny Mix Tapes applauded The-Dream's interpretation of the "pop formula" and dubbed the album "a fascinating and at-times sonically remarkable post-structuralist-esque move". The Boston Globes Ken Capobianco called it "a seamless, brilliantly produced affair featuring his unmatched contemporary pop technique and songwriting craftsmanship".

Some reviewers were more reserved in their praise. Tyler Fisher of PopMatters called Love vs. Money "an R&B pop album with great production, composition, and lyricism", but also observed "cliché love songs, too many similar beats and melodies, and a lack of energy". Robert Christgau, writing in Blender magazine, said The-Dream and Tricky Stewart's "multiplex jams" are of "deeper intrinsic sensual interest" than the hooks of the more popular R&B singer Akon, highlighting the track "Love vs. Money: Part 2". But overall, Christgau found the album "studiously conventional" and questioned whether another "gloriously eccentric sex album" was needed after Love Hate. Regarding its lyrical content, he concluded, "The-Dream will turn on only the many hopeful ladies who consider Patrón the most exquisite of aphrodisiacs." More critical was Entertainment Weeklys Mikael Wood, who believed the lyrics are marred by "material obsession", and said The-Dream's "vision of romance mostly plays like a nightmare".

At the end of 2009, the album was ranked by Rolling Stone as the year's eighth best. Time ranked the album number six on its year-end list for 2009.

Track listing

Notes
  signifies a co-producer

Personnel
Credits are adapted from AllMusic.

 Chris Bellman – mastering
 Lee Blaske – strings
 Dre Bowman – bass
 Mariah Carey – vocals
 Joseph Cultice – photography
 Steven Dennis – assistant engineer
 The-Dream – audio production, vocals
 Mark Grey – mixing assistant
 Christy Hall – production assistant
 Ryan Kelly – assistant engineer
 Giancarlo Lino – mixing assistant

 Pamela Littky – cover photo, inlay photography
 Chris "Tek" O'Ryan – engineer, production engineer
 Dave Pensado – mixing
 J. Peter Robinson – art direction
 Jason Sherwood – assistant engineer
 Chris "Tricky" Stewart – producer, audio production
 Brian "B Luv" Thomas – engineer
 Pat Thrall – engineer, production engineer
 Randy Urbanski – assistant engineer
 Kanye West – vocals
 Ryan West – vocal recording
 Andrew Wuepper – engineer, mixing assistant

Charts

Weekly charts

Year-end charts

Certifications

See also
 How to Be a Lady: Volume 1
 Song cycle

References

External links
 
 "The-Dream, Has High Hopes for New Album" by The New York Times

2009 albums
The-Dream albums
Def Jam Recordings albums
Albums produced by The-Dream
Albums produced by Lil Jon
Albums produced by Tricky Stewart
Albums recorded at Chung King Studios
Sequel albums